Jayadevi (fl. 713) was the queen regnant of the Kingdom of Chenla, the predecessor polity of the Khmer Empire, from 681 to 713.

She was the daughter of king Jayavarman I. She also had a sister, princess Sobhajaya, who married the Indian Sivait Brahim Sakrasvamin.

She succeeded her father as monarch upon his death in 681. She was the first female ruler since queen Kulaprabhavati.

Traditionally, her succession has been interpreted as contested, creating a turmoil ultimately resulting in the division of Cambodia.  It is attested that in 707, the kingdom was divided in two: Land Chenla and Water Chenla.  There is little information about the Land and Water Chenla, which eventually were divided further.

In 713, she left an inscription at Angkor in which she laments the bad times of the kingdom, and mention the donation she made to the sanctuary of Siva Tripurankata, which had been founded by her sister.  It is unknown how long she ruled after 713. In 716, a king named Pushkara is mentioned in an inscription, and it has been suggested that he obtained his position by marrying his son, Sambhuvarman II to a female Isanapura monarch, but this is not confirmed, and he may also have simply been an usurper.

An alternative interpretation is that King Pushkara was in fact her own son and successor rather than her rival.  Further more, while Chinese sources mention that Chenla consisted of two kingdoms in 707, it appears that Chenla consisted of several smaller polities already prior to this point and that the interpretation that this signified a split was incorrect: King Pushkara married Queen Indrani and became co-monarch of her kingdom, indicating that there already was another polity within Chenla before this.

References

 Coedes, G. (1962). "The Making of South-east Asia." London: Cox & Wyman Ltd.
 George Cœdès: The Indianized States of South-East Asia

7th-century Cambodian monarchs
Hindu monarchs
8th-century Cambodian monarchs
7th-century women rulers
8th-century women rulers
8th-century Cambodian women
7th-century Cambodian women
Chenla